Paulo Henrique Soares dos Santos (born 10 July 1994), simply known as Paulinho, is a Brazilian professional footballer who current plays for Chinese Super League club Shanghai Port as a winger.

Club career
Born  in Ceilândia, Distrito Federal, Paulinho finished his formation with EC Bahia, and appeared on the bench on 11 March 2012, against Juazeiro SC. In December, his rights were sold to a group of investors, which arranged trials to various clubs, including Real Madrid.

On 22 January 2013, Paulinho signed an 18-month contract with Córdoba CF. On 24 March, he played his first match as a professional, in a 0-4 defeat against Real Madrid Castilla.

In July, Paulinho rescinded his contract with the Andalusians, and remained nearly seven months without a club before joining Cádiz CF in Segunda División B. On 25 August 2014, after appearing rarely, he moved to fellow league team CD Eldense.

On 28 January 2015 Paulinho switched teams and countries again, joining Segunda Liga's S.C. Beira-Mar.

In January 2016, Paulinho joined Farense.

On 21 January 2018, Paulinho joined FC Porto on loan for the remainder of the season, in a deal that included a buyout option.

On 27 July 2021, Paulinho joined Shanghai Port.

Career statistics 
Statistics accurate as of match played 31 December 2022.

References

External links
 
 
 

1994 births
Living people
Sportspeople from Federal District (Brazil)
Brazilian footballers
Brazilian expatriate footballers
Association football wingers
Esporte Clube Bahia players
Córdoba CF players
Cádiz CF players
CD Eldense footballers
Liga Portugal 2 players
S.C. Beira-Mar players
C.D. Santa Clara players
Portimonense S.C. players
FC Porto players
Hebei F.C. players
Segunda División players
Segunda División B players
Primeira Liga players
Brazilian expatriate sportspeople in Spain
Brazilian expatriate sportspeople in Portugal
Brazilian expatriate sportspeople in China
Expatriate footballers in Spain
Expatriate footballers in Portugal
Expatriate footballers in China